Paul Matías Zunino Escudero (born 20 April 1990) is a Uruguayan footballer who plays as a midfielder for Nacional on loan from L.D.U. Quito in Ecuador.

Honours
LDU Quito
Supercopa Ecuador: 2020

References

External links
Profile at FOX Sports

1990 births
Living people
People from Canelones, Uruguay
Uruguayan footballers
Uruguayan expatriate footballers
Danubio F.C. players
Sud América players
El Tanque Sisley players
Defensor Sporting players
Club Nacional de Football players
L.D.U. Quito footballers
Uruguayan Primera División players
Ecuadorian Serie A players
Association football midfielders
Uruguayan expatriate sportspeople in Ecuador
Expatriate footballers in Ecuador